Sylvie may refer to:

 Sylvie (novel), an 1853 novel by Gérard de Nerval
 Sylvie (actress) (1883–1970), French actress
 Sylvie (band), a Canadian rock band from Regina, active in the 2000s
 Sylvie (album), a 1962 album by Sylvie Vartan
 "Sylvie" (song), a 1998 song by Saint Etienne

People with the given name

 Sylvie Andrich-Duval (born 1958), Luxembourgish politician
 Sylvie Andrieux (born 1961), French politician
 Sylvie Bouchet Bellecourt (born 1957), French politician
 Sylvie D'Amours (born 1960), Canadian politician from Quebec
 Sylvie Fadlallah (born 1948), Lebanese diplomat 
 Sylvie Fortier (born 1958), Canadian former synchronized swimming
 Sylvie Goulard (born 1964), French politician and civil servant
 Sylvie Honigman (born 1965), lecturer in ancient history at Tel Aviv University
 Sylvie Kauffmann (born 1955), French journalist
 Sylvie Pétiaux (1836-1919), French feminist and pacifist
 Sylvie Testud (born 1971), French actress
 Sylvie Tolmont (born 1962), French politician
 Sylvie Vartan (born 1944), Bulgarian-French-Armenian singer and actress
 Sylvie Vauclair (born 1946), French astrophysicist

Fictional characters
 Sylvie Brett, from the American TV series Chicago Fire
 Sylvie Carter, from the British soap opera EastEnders
 Sylvie Latham, from the Australian soap opera Neighbours
 Sylvie Lushton, from Marvel Comics, also known as Enchantress
 Sylvie (Marvel Cinematic Universe), an alternate version of Loki from the 2021 Disney+ series Loki

See also
 
 Sylvia (disambiguation)

French feminine given names
English feminine given names